Botley is a historic village in Hampshire, England. The village was once described as “the most delightful village in the world” by 18th century journalist and radical politician William Cobbett. The village was developed as a natural crossing point for the River Hamble, and received its first market charter from Henry III in 1267. The village grew on the success of its mill, its coaching inns, and more recently strawberries.

Botley today, reflects its heritage and retains its traditional charm. Visitors may walk the self guided Cobbett trail, stop for refreshments at the many excellent local venues, visit the individual shops in the Square or Botley Mills. However, Botley is also cited in extensive scenic countryside, close to Manor Farm, River Hamble Country Park and the River Hamble, the long distance Strawberry Trail, and the picturesque coast of the Solent at Hamble-le-Rice.

History
When the Romans built a road from Noviomagus Reginorum (Chichester) to Clausentum (Southampton), it crossed the River Hamble at a natural crossing point located to the south of present-day Botley. The crossing later became the site of Botley's first settlement, which existed at least as far back as the 10th century. Known in Saxon times as "Bottaleah" ("Botta" was probably a person, while "Leah" was the Saxon word for a woodland clearing). Some time prior to the Norman conquest, a gradual rise in sea level meant that travellers found the river easier to ford further north of the original Roman crossing, this new crossing place provided a new focal point for the village, which in 1086 was listed in the Domesday book as "Botelie" and included two mills and had a population of less than 100.

In 1267 John of Botley, Lord of the Manor, obtained a royal charter from Henry III for holding an annual fair and weekly market in the town. The village did not, however, grow significantly and in 1665 the village still had a population of only 350.

During the eighteenth century, Botley functioned as a small inland port with barges transporting coal, grain, timber and flour along the river. The first bridge over the tidal part of the river was built in 1797 and by the time of the 1801 census 614 people were residing in the village. During the first half of the nineteenth century, the radical journalist and political reformer William Cobbett, lived in Botley and called it "the most delightful village in the world". A corn market was opened in 1829 and a cattle market in 1836, while Botley Market Hall – today a Grade II listed building – was built in 1848. A new All Saints church was built nearer the village centre in 1836. The National School opened in 1855 and the Recreation Ground was purchased in 1888. In the mid-nineteenth century the climate made south Hampshire ideal for growing strawberries and Botley became the centre for a thriving trade in strawberries. In 1841 Botley railway station was opened by the London and Southampton Railway Company. It became a major loading point for the seasonal strawberry traffic, as Botley formed the start of what is now known as the Strawberry Trail.

Places of worship

Botley has possessed a place of worship for at least nine hundred years.

 The early church, commonly called St Bartholomew's, adjacent to the old village of Boteleigh, was mentioned in the Domesday Book of 1086. This church was largely destroyed by the falling of a large poplar tree onto the nave resulting in the original capacity of 500 being reduced to what had been the chancel.

The replacement church, dedicated to All Saints’, was constructed between 1835–6 as a result of a petition to the Bishop of Winchester and much fund-raising, following the destruction of the old church. The centre of the village had long since moved away from the old church and parishioners were finding it increasingly troublesome to take the path across the fields to the church. Prior to this, a 'Dissenters Church' had been built in Winchester Street in 1800 and was attracting a growing congregation.
The parcel of land on which the church is built was given by James Warner (Snr) and the foundation stone was laid on 11 June 1835. The building was consecrated on 22 August 1836 at a service with a congregation of 700.

The Walker’s organ was installed in 1852, later enlarged and recently dismantled, enlarged and overhauled. Baker died and his successor was John Morley Lee, who was bought the benefice by his father, a London builder who built a new rectory for his son. The present chancel and choir vestry were added in 1859.

Further large increases in population made necessary the major work of removing the North Wall and replacing it with an arcade supported by oaken pillars on stone bases. A lower outer wall was built of stone crowned by a parapet. This, with the installation of dormer windows to improve the interior lighting, greatly improved the Northern aspect of the building by reducing the large area of slated roof visible from the ground. The work was completed and consecrated by The Lord Bishop of Winchester on 25 October 1892. With this increase in seating capacity the gallery across the West End was removed and the access from the tower filled in.

The narthex across the West End was added in 1895 and removed in October 2006 to make way for an extension on the west end of the church. The church room was built in 1967.

On 2 October 2006 work began on an extension to the west end of the church. The narthex was removed and foundations laid for a two-storey extension. Funding for this work was provided by a substantial legacy from the Maffey sisters and the fund-raising of parishioners. The extension was completed in 2008. 

The Church's font dates to around the 12th century. It was recovered from a field in 1740.

Twin towns
Botley is twinned with:

 Saint-Jean-Brévelay, France
 Plumelec, France
 Plaudren, France

References

External links

Botley village
Walks in the Hamble Valley
Botley Flour Mills heritage

Villages in Hampshire
Borough of Eastleigh
Civil parishes in Hampshire